Sarter is a surname. Notable people with the surname include:

Martin Sarter, German-American psychologist, married to Nadine
Nadine Sarter (born 1959), German-American industrial engineer, married to Martin
 (1833–1902), German-French financial expert

See also
Sartre (surname)